The Sun Odyssey 43 DS (Deck Salon) is a French sailboat that was designed by Daniel Andrieu as a racer-cruiser and first built in 1994.

The design replaced the 1986 Sun Odyssey 43 in production.

Production
The design was built by Jeanneau in France, from 1994 to 2006, but it is now out of production.

Design
The Sun Odyssey 43 DS is a recreational keelboat, built predominantly of solid fiberglass, with wooden structural members. It has a masthead sloop rig, with a deck-stepped mast, two sets of swept spreaders and aluminum spars with stainless steel wire rigging. The hull has a raked stem, a reverse transom, an internally mounted spade-type rudder controlled by twin wheels and a fixed fin keel with a weighted bulb or an optional shoal draft keel. It displaces  and carries  of ballast.

The design was built in several cabin interior configurations. The two cabin version has sleeping accommodation for four people, with a double "V"-berth in the bow cabin, a "U"-shaped settee in the main cabin and an aft cabin with a central double berth. The galley is located on the starboard side just forward of the companionway ladder. The galley is "L"-shaped and is equipped with a two-burner stove, an ice box and a double sink. A navigation station is opposite the galley, on the port side. There are two heads, one just aft of the bow cabin on the port side and one on the port side in the aft cabin.

Operational history
The design has been used by private owners and also in the yacht charter market.

In a 2001 review in Sailing Magazine, John Kretschmer wrote, "Designed by Daniel Andrieu, the boat is nicely proportioned. The lines are modern with short overhangs and a generous beam of 13 feet, 8 inches. The low-slung coachroof extends quite far forward but still tapers gracefully into the foredeck."

Cruising World reviewer, Tim Murphy wrote in 2002, "Built of hand-laid fiberglass without a core, the 43 hull, like other Jeanneau sailboats, is stiffened with laminated-wood longitudinal stringers and ring frames and without structural liners."

Writing in Practical Sailor in 2001, Darrell Nicholson described, "sailing in 5- to 7-knot winds under full main and 135-percent genoa, she registered 5.5 to 6 knots of boatspeed sailing hard on the breeze into a 2 -3′ swell. Considering that the rig needed tuning and she was equipped with furlers on both sails, we consider that good performance. We noted that an increase of only two knots in windspeed increased boatspeed over the ground to more than six knots while sailing into an ebbing current."

See also
List of sailing boat types

References

External links

Keelboats
1990s sailboat type designs
Sailing yachts
Sailboat type designs by Daniel Andrieu
Sailboat types built by Jeanneau